is a Japanese politician who served as the Chief Cabinet Secretary from 1999 to 2000, and was briefly Acting Prime Minister following Keizo Obuchi’s coma. A member of the Liberal Democratic Party, he also served as the Chairman of the LDP in the House of Councillors. He studied at Waseda University but did not graduate.

References

|-

|-

1934 births
Living people
20th-century prime ministers of Japan
People from Izumo, Shimane
Government ministers of Japan
Members of the House of Councillors (Japan)
Prime Ministers of Japan
Liberal Democratic Party (Japan) politicians
Waseda University alumni